Marcel Granollers was the defending champion.
Marc López defeated 5–7, 6–4, 7–6(11–9) Pere Riba in the final.

Seeds

Draw

Final four

Top half

Bottom half

External links
 Main Draw
 Qualifying Draw

2009,Singles
Tanger,Singles